Bell Bank is a privately owned interstate bank headquartered in Fargo, North Dakota, with assets of $11 billion Bell Bank, which employs more than 1,900 people (more than 560 in the Twin Cities region) 
has 20 full-service banking locations in North Dakota, Minnesota and Arizona, and mortgage locations in Arizona, Colorado, Florida, Kansas, Illinois, Minnesota, Missouri, New Mexico, North Dakota, Tennessee and Wisconsin. State Bankshares is Bell Bank's parent company.

History and growth

Bell Bank was founded as State Bank of Fargo in 1966 as a single location in the Northport Shopping Center in Fargo. Thomas "Buck" Snortland was one of the company's founders.

In 2003, the bank bought Northern Capital Trust, a trust company and flex spending adjudication business. Richard Solberg, who was then the bank's president and CEO, had served on the board of directors for Northern Capital Trust since the company was established—16 years before the merger.

Not long after the merger, Bell created a spin-off company called Discovery Benefits, which administers flexible benefits, COBRA and health savings accounts.  Bell also started HealthcareBank, one of the largest health care savings account banks and a client of Discovery Benefits. In 2019, State Bankshares announced plans to sell Discovery Benefits for $425 million to Wex Inc., a South Portland, Maine-based payment processing and business solutions provider. In 2021, Bell and WEX agreed to WEX's acquisition of certain HSA assets of HealthcareBank.

In 2011, the company acquired Minneapolis-based Bell Mortgage, expanding its reach into the Twin Cities and Phoenix, Ariz. The company changed its name from State Bank & Trust to Bell State Bank & Trust in 2012 and to Bell Bank in Aug., 2016. In 2013, Bell acquired Minneapolis-based The Business Bank and its Prime Mortgage Division. Bell Bank Mortgage expanded its offices into Wisconsin and New Mexico in 2018, Florida, Missouri and Tennessee in 2019, and Kansas in 2020.

Bell launched an equipment finance division in Minneapolis in 2018, to serve the manufacturing, transportation, construction and agriculture industries.

In 2019, Bell signed a purchase agreement to buy Warner and Company Insurance in Fargo, Schiller Insurance in Detroit Lakes, Minnesota, and Thompson-Schaefer Insurance Agency in Grand Forks, North Dakota, and rebranded them as Bell Insurance. 

Bell opened its first full-service bank branch in Arizona—in the city of Chandler, Arizona—in 2019, and its second in Phoenix – Biltmore in 2020.

In 2020, Bell expanded into Forest Lake, Minn., and Duluth, Minn., renovating and occupying the downtown Temple Opera Building.

In 2021, Bell opened a branch in downtown Minneapolis' City Center and announced its entrance into the Denver market. Bell also announce its purchase of a 12-story building at 520 Main Ave. in downtown Fargo, which will be remodeled in 2022 and reopen in 2023 as Bell's new headquarters. The same year, Bell entered a 10-year naming rights partnership with Legacy Sports USA and Oak View Group for Bell Bank Park, a 320-acre, multipurpose sports and entertainment complex in Mesa, Ariz.

In 2022, Bell finalized its building lease for a new mortgage servicing center in Owensboro, Ky. Bell also opened its first loan production office in Denver, focused on commercial lending, and launched Bell Business Credit, a specialty lending team providing asset-based lending and factoring services for working capital intensive companies.

Bell has a 5-star rating from Bauer Financial, an independent bank research firm. Based on financial data from federal regulators, a 5-star rating, the highest rating the firm awards, means a bank is financially sound and is operating well above its capital requirements.

The company plans to remain privately owned.

Leadership

Michael Solberg is Bell Bank's president, and the third CEO in the company's history. He was named CEO in 2014, succeeding his father, Richard Solberg, who had been CEO since 1982.

Michael Solberg was named chief operating officer in 2004 and president in 2009. He started with the company in 1998 after graduating from Concordia College in Moorhead, Minnesota, and William Mitchell College of Law in Saint Paul, Minnesota. He grew up in Finley, North Dakota, and Fargo.

Richard Solberg is the board chairman and a company shareholder. The bank is owned by about 70 shareholders, with a majority stake held by the families of Richard Solberg, Michael Solberg, Julie Snortland and Laura Snortland Fairfield. Other major shareholders have included Thomas "Buck" Snortland and his son, Thomas "Mickey" Snortland, both farmers from Sharon, North Dakota.

Thomas "Mickey" Snortland, who was also a longtime director of the bank, died in 2013 of an apparent heart attack.

Before working for what was then State Bank of Fargo, Richard Solberg was president of Citizens State Bank in Finley, where he grew up. He also graduated from Concordia College. Under Richard Solberg's leadership, the bank grew from a single location with $28 million in assets to 20 branches in North Dakota and Minnesota with more than $3 billion in assets. In 2022, Richard Solberg received the Legacy Leader Award from the Fargo Moorhead West Fargo Chamber of Commerce 

NorthWestern Financial Review named Richard and Michael Solberg Bankers of the Year in 2012.

Additional executive leadership includes: Patrick Chaffee, EVP/banking, wealth management & insurance, Todd Lee, EVP/banking & commercial lending administration, Laine Brantner, EVP/chief operating officer, Julie Peterson Klein, EVP/chief of staff and chief culture officer, Tony Weick, EVP/Bell Bank Mortgage president, Lynn Johnson, EVP/retail banking, Jon Aarsvold, EVP/chief credit officer,  Jenny Senecal, EVP/deputy chief credit officer Jena Cogswell, EVP/chief marketing officer, Tim Gelinske, EVP/strategic initiatives and partnerships, Blake Nelson, EVP/chief financial officer, Gary Inman, EVP/information systems manager, and Jesse Schwab, EVP/chief risk officer.

Company culture

Several media outlets, including USA Today, People magazine and the BBC have written stories about Bell Bank's culture. Bell's mission statement is Happy Employees! Happy Customers! Michael Solberg says the bank's growth and profits are due to the way the company treats its employees. In 2016, Bell announced it would make an employee stock ownership plan (ESOP) part of employees' retirement benefits. A portion of each employee's retirement funds will be invested in State Bankshares stock.

Awards received by Bell Bank
Bell Bank has been recognized with multiple awards.

Fortune magazine named Bell to its list of 100 Best Companies to Work For in 2022, and the Best Workplaces in Financial Services & Insurance in 2022, 2021, 2020 and 2019; Best Workplaces for Women in 2022, 2021, 2020 and 2019; Best Workplaces for Millennials in 2022, 2021, 2020 and 2019; and Best Workplaces for Parents in 2021 and 2020. 

Bell ranked 32nd on People magazine's list of 100 Companies That Care in 2022 and 87th in 2021.

Forbes ranked Bell among the World's Best Banks and Best-in-State bank for North Dakota in 2020. In 2019, Forbes ranked Bell among the World's Best Banks and second in U.S.-only banks. In 2018, Forbes named Bell Best Bank in North Dakota and Minnesota.
 
American Banker Magazine named Bell No. 3 on its Best Banks to Work For list in 2022 and No. 1 in 2021. Bell also made the magazine’s list in 2020, 2019, 2018, 2017, 2016, 2015, 2014 and 2013.

Star Tribune Media Co. named Bell the No. 2 large workplace in 2022 
 and No. 2 large workplace and top banking workplace in Minnesota in 2021 and has included Bell on the StarTribune's Top Workplaces list every year since 2011. In 2016, the media company also recognized Bell with an ethics award.

Pay It Forward program

Part of Bell Bank's culture is its Pay It Forward program, which Michael Solberg started in 2007. The program gives full-time employees $1,000 and part-time employees $500 each year to give to people and organizations in need. Bell has given more than $24 million in employee-driven charitable giving since launching. Julie Peterson Klein heads the Pay It Forward program.

Community outreach

In 2022, Bell launched a “Big Blue Bus” that will bring banking, mortgage and financial planning resources into neighborhoods throughout the company’s geographic area. Bell also co-hosted a “shark tank” style accelerator called Get Down to Business with The Get Down Coffee Co. and Neighborhood Development Center at the 3M Open, where they gave away $100,000 to three diverse entrepreneurs to grow their businesses. The grants were funded by Bell Bank and 3M Open Fund and facilitated by Neighborhood Development Center.

Sponsorships and endorsements

Bell has formed partnerships with athletes and other celebrities with North Dakota and Minnesota ties. Some of them work with Bell on charitable causes.
They include:
Larry Fitzgerald Jr., philanthropist and former NFL player
Josh Duhamel, American actor and former fashion model
Ben Johnson (basketball), college basketball coach
Marney Gellner, Minnesota sports broadcaster
Matt Cullen, retired American NHL player
Ben Leber, retired Minnesota Vikings linebacker and sports radio personality
Gavin Kaysen, James Beard Award-winning chef, who owns three Minneapolis restaurants 
Mark Tarbell, chef, restaurateur, wine columnist, Iron Chef America winner and two-time inductee into the Arizona Hall of Culinary Fame
Lindsay Whalen, University of Minnesota women's basketball coach and former Minnesota Lynx women's basketball player
Tyus Jones, American professional basketball player 
Chris Hawkey, country music artist and sports radio personality
The Blenders, Minneapolis-based vocal quartet
Amy Olson, American professional golfer
Tom Hoge, American professional golfer
Branden Scheel, American triathlete
Minnesota United FC, an American professional soccer club based in the Minneapolis–Saint Paul area

References 

Banks based in North Dakota
Companies based in Fargo–Moorhead
1966 establishments in North Dakota
American companies established in 1966
Banks established in 1966
Mortgage lenders of the United States
Insurance companies of the United States